The 2015–16 FIBA Europe Cup was the inaugural season of the newly formed basketball competition organised by FIBA. The season started on 21 October 2015 and ended on 1 May 2016.

The competition replaced the EuroChallenge and had the aim to take the place of Eurocup (organised by Euroleague Basketball), as the second-tier competition in Europe.

Format
In the Regular season, 56 teams are divided into 14 groups of four teams. In the Round of 32, the first and second best teams from the Regular season play in groups of four. Starting from the Round of 16, quarter-finals will be played. The tournament will conclude with a Final Four.

Teams
The deadline to register in the competition was on July 30. The official list of teams was announced on August 3.

Numbers in bracket represent the place the team took in its 2014–15 domestic championship, representing rankings after eventual Playoffs.
Notes
 Porto played last season in the Portuguese second tier, Proliga.
 Hibernia was a newly created team, established by Basketball Ireland to compete in the competition.
 FIBA Europe announced that the Romanian club BC Timișoara have withdrawn their participation in the competition. Helios Suns replaced the team.

Draw
The draw was held on August 4, 2015 in Munich, Germany. The seeding was prepared on the basis of the clubs' participation and results in European Club Competition in recent years as well as the clubs' ranking in their respective domestic leagues last season.

Conference 1

Conference 2

Regular season

The regular season was played between 21 October and 2 December 2015. The top two teams of each group and the four best third-placed teams of all groups (two teams from each Conference) advanced to the Round of 32.

If teams in the same group finished tied on points at the end of the Regular Season, tiebreakers were applied in the following order:
 Head-to-head record.
 Head-to-head point differential.
 Point differential during the regular season.
 Points scored during the regular season.
 Sum of quotients of points scored and points allowed in each regular season match.

Group A

Group B

Group C

Group D

Group E

Group F

Group G

Group H

Group I

Group J

Group K

Group L

Group M

Group N

Ranking of third-placed teams

Conference 1

Conference 2

Round of 32
The round of 32 were played between 16 December 2015 and 3 February 2016. The two top teams of each group advanced to the Round of 16.

If teams in the same group finished tied on points at the end of the Round of 32, tiebreakers were applied in the following order:
 Head-to-head record.
 Head-to-head point differential.
 Point differential during the round of 32.
 Points scored during the round of 32.
 Sum of quotients of points scored and points allowed in each round of 32 match.

Group O

Group P

Group Q

Group R

Group S

Group T

Group U

Group V

Knockout stage

Round of 16 
Game 1 will be played on February 17. Game 2 will be played on February 24. Game 3, if necessary, will be played on March 2.

The eight winners of each series will qualify for the quarterfinals, while the other eight teams will be eliminated.

Quarter-finals 
Game 1 will be played on March 16. Game 2 will be played on March 23. Game 3 will be played, if necessary, on March 30. Teams with better record in the Round of 32 had the home advantage.

The four winners of each series will qualify to the Final Four, while the other four teams will be eliminated.

Final Four 

On April 6, 2016, Le Colisée in Chalon-sur-Saône was announced as the venue for the Final Four.

Honours

Final Four MVP

Starting Five

Statistics

Individual statistic leaders
To be considered a statistical leader, players had to have played a minimum of 10 games.

Source: FIBA Europe Cup

Individual game highs

Source: FIBA Europe Cup

Finals rosters

 Fraport Skyliners Frankfurt Jordan Theodore, Quantez Robertson, Johannes Voigtmann, Philip Scrubb, Aaron Doornekamp, Danilo Barthel, Mike Morrison, John Little, Konstantin Klein, Johannes Richter, Max Merz, Stefan Ilzhöfer, Tomas Dimša, Tim Oldenburg, Garai Zeeb. Coach: Gordon Herbert
 Openjobmetis Varese Chris Wright, Brandon Davies, Maalik Wayns, Rihards Kuksiks, Kristjan Kangur, Luca Campani, Daniele Cavaliero, Giancarlo Ferrero, Mouhammad Faye, Ovidijus Varanauskas, Lorenzo Molinaro, Manuel Rossi, Umberto Pietrini, Filippo Testa, Jacopo Lepri, Ramon Galloway, Mychel Thompson, Jevohn Shepherd. Coach: Paolo Moretti

See also
2015–16 Euroleague
2015–16 Eurocup Basketball

References

External links
Official website
FIBA Europe Cup at Eurobasket

 
2015-16
2015–16 in European basketball leagues